Dorucak, historically Zengül, is a village in the Musabeyli District, Kilis Province, Turkey. The village had a population of 190 in 2022.

In late 19th century, the village was a settlement of 10 houses inhabited by Kurds.

References

Villages in Musabeyli District
Kurdish settlements in Kilis Province